

The Doman LZ-4 was an American eight-seat helicopter designed and developed by Doman Helicopters of Danbury, Connecticut.

Design and development
Following the test flying of the Doman LZ-2A, Doman Helicopters developed an eight-seat helicopter with the designation LZ-4. The fuselage had 3 rows of double seats in the main cabin and a two-crew flight deck in the front. Large folding doors allowed for loading bulky cargo into the main compartment. The tail boom was conventional with a cranked-up rear section mounting a tail rotor, and the helicopter was supported by a four-leg undercarriage.

Specifications (LZ-4)

References

1940s United States experimental aircraft
1940s United States helicopters
Single-engined piston helicopters
Aircraft first flown in 1950